Kanchana Mahendran (born 12 January 1998) is a Sri Lankan rugby sevens player.

Mahendran competed for Sri Lanka at the 2022 Commonwealth Games in Birmingham where they finished in eighth place.

References 

Living people
1998 births
Female rugby sevens players
Sri Lanka international women's rugby sevens players
Sri Lankan Tamil sportspeople
Rugby sevens players at the 2022 Commonwealth Games